Naval Base Funafuti was a naval base built by the United States Navy in 1942 to support the World War II effort. The base was located on the Island of Funafuti of the Ellice Islands in the Western Pacific Ocean. The island is now Tuvalu, an island country in the Polynesian. After the surprise attack on Naval Station Pearl Harbor on December 7, 1941, the US Navy was in need of setting up more advance bases in the Pacific Ocean. At Naval Base Funafuti the Navy built a sea port, a small hospital, PT boat base, a seaplane base and an airbase.

History
The United States Armed Forces started the construction of an airfield on Funafuti before the US entered the war. The US Army had some troops on Funafuti and refused the US Navy's request to have a Naval Base on the island in early 1942. The US Navy requested the base as Fongafale is midway between Hawaii and Australia, a key refueling and communications link. On October 2, 1942, the US Navy landed the United States Marine Corps 5th Defense Battalion and arrived with 11 naval ships, in Operation Fetlock. Operation Fetlock was a secret mission, but on March 27, 1943, the Empire of Japan discovered the new base. Soon after the Marine Corps landing the US Navy started dredging the Te Bua Bua Channel, so ships could anchorage in the island's lagoon. Local natives helped the building of the base, most spoke English, as they had learned it from the London Missionary delegation on the island. To USS Terror (CM-5) laid naval mines to the passages the navy was not using to get to the lagoon. The port and base were needed for the planned attacks on the Gilbert Islands (Kiribati) that were occupied by Japanese forces. After Japan discovered the new base, they made ten air raids on the new base from Nauru on April 20, 1943, and Japan's Tarawa base on April 22. The 10 raids were from March to November 1943. In Japan's raid the Funafuti base, the US Navy's 90mm antiaircraft guns were able to shoot down six bombers. By November 1942 the Navy completed a  hard-packed coral. runway. VMF-441 a Marine Fighting Squadron, did missions with F4F Wildcat, operated from Funafuti from May to September 1943. The new runway was about to land Consolidated B-24 Liberator bombers that bombed Japan's bases on the Gilberts Islands in 1944. The bomders were from the United States Army Air Forces VII Bomber Command. On December 15, 1942, four VOS float planes (Vought OS2U Kingfisher) from VS-1-D14 arrived at Funafuti to carry out anti-submarine patrols. PBY Catalina flying boats of US Navy Patrol Squadrons were stationed at Funafuti for short periods of time, including VP-34, which arrived at Funafuti on 18 August 1943 and VP-33, which arrived on September 26, 1943. In April 1943, a detachment of the 3rd Battalion constructed an aviation-gasoline tank farm on Fongafale`. The base was built on three of the nine island atolls of the Ellice islands: Funafuti, Nanomea and Nukufetau. At Funafuti that US Merchant Navy tankers transferred their fuel to US Navy fleet oilers, which transported the fuel into the combat zone to fuel warships. In the lagoon a small seaplane base and PT-boat bases were built. Naval Base Funafuti supported Operation Catchpole in the Marshall Islands group. At Naval Base Funafuti US Merchant Navy tanker ships transferred fuel to US Navy fleet oilers. The fleet oilers would fuel warships ship closer to the combat zone. By July 1944, the war had moved closer to Japan and much of the base was moved to more forward bases. After the airfield became commercial airport, Funafuti International Airport.

Service Squadron 4
As operations at Naval Base Funafuti increased more support was needed. The US Navy started and sent Service Squadron 4 to Naval Base Funafuti arriving on November 21, 1943. The Service Squadron ships supported ships at port and supplement the land base operations. Service Squadron 4 started with 24 ships based at Funafuti port. Stationed at the port was the flagship, a destroyer tender . Service Squadron 4 operated as a complete floating naval base with tenders, repair ships and concrete barges. Some other ships in Service Squadron 4: The internal combustion engine repair ship USS Luzon (ARG-2), tugboat Keosanqua I (AT-38), oiler USS Truckee (AO-147), hospital ship USS Chaumont, for good storage the USS Alchiba; Troopship, barracks ships: USs Republic, USS Henderson, USS Harris, USS St. Mihiel, USS U. S. Grant (AP-29). The USS Mettawee (AOG-17), an oil tanker, served as a station tanker at Funafuti from February through April 1943.

Supported airfields
Naval Base Funafuti, Naval Base Samoa and Naval Base Fiji supported three airfields:
Naval Base to support Nanumea Airfield  at Nanumea, Ellice Islands, closed 1945
Naval Base to support Nukufetau Airfield at Nukufetau, Ellice Islands, closed 1945
Naval Base Canton Island to support Airfield in the Phoenix Islands, closed 1945

See also

US Naval Advance Bases
Nukufetau Airfield
Nanumea Airfield
History of Tuvalu
Louis Zamperini flyer at Funafuti
Naval Base Samoa

References

Naval Base Funafuti
Naval Stations of the United States Navy
Closed installations of the United States Navy
20th century in American Samoa
1942 establishments in Oceania
1945 disestablishments in Oceania
Military installations established in 1942
Military installations closed in 1945